Ante Hameršmit (born 2 June 1949) is a Croatian football manager and former player. He made his career in Yugoslavia and France. His name was usually referred to in Yugoslavia as Ante Hameršmit, but abroad it was not unusual to see his also referred to either simply without diacritics, Ante Hamersmit, or as Ante Hamerschmit.

Club career
Born in Senj, HR Croatia, he started playing professionally in Serbian clubs FK Spartak Subotica and FK Proleter Zrenjanin before returning to Croatia and joining giants HNK Hajduk Split.

In 1975 he moves abroad to France and joins Limoges where he played 4 seasons. Next, he signs with US Orléans where plays 2 seasons before ending his career at Le Mans where he played for another two seasons until 1983.

International career
He made 2 appearances and scored one goal for Yugoslav Olympic team in 1971, and a year later he made one appearance as well for the Yugoslav amateur national team.

Coaching career
He was the main coach of French side Sablé FC between 2002 and 2007.

Honours
Orleans
Coupe de France finaliste: 1980

References

External links
 Profile at Football Database

1949 births
Living people
People from Sinj
Association football forwards
Yugoslav footballers
FK Spartak Subotica players
FK Proleter Zrenjanin players
HNK Hajduk Split players
Yugoslav First League players
Limoges FC players
US Orléans players
Le Mans FC players
Ligue 2 players
Yugoslav expatriate footballers
Expatriate footballers in France
Yugoslav expatriate sportspeople in France
Croatian football managers
Croatian expatriate football managers
Expatriate football managers in France
Croatian expatriate sportspeople in France